The Roger Crozier Saving Grace Award, officially billed as the MBNA/MasterCard Roger Crozier Saving Grace Award, was an award in ice hockey given annually to the goaltender who finished the regular season with the best save percentage in the National Hockey League (NHL).  Only goaltenders who played 25 games or more in the season were eligible for the award.  A goaltender's save percentage represents the percentage of shots on goal that he stops, and is calculated by dividing the number of saves by the total number of shots on goal.

It was presented by the MBNA corporation in memory of Crozier, who worked for the MBNA America Bank after retiring as a player, and died on January 11, 1996. The winner of the trophy received a commemorative crystal trophy and was given US$25,000 to donate to a youth hockey or other educational program of their choice.

By 2007, when it ceased being presented, the award had been handed to six different players on seven occasions. Marty Turco is the only goaltender to have won the award twice. Three Dallas Stars goalies have won the award, while two each have represented the Montreal Canadiens and the Minnesota Wild. Only seven awards were ever made. The award was not presented in 2005, as the entire  was canceled due to the lockout.

Winners

† - Belfour was a prior save percentage leader in the 1990-91 season, before the Crozier Award was first presented.

Save-percentage leaders (1956–1999)
Before 2000, there was no award for leading the league in save percentage. The NHL started counting the statistic in 1982, while records have been compiled for save percentage back into the mid-1950s.

Bold denotes highest season save percentage on record

* Season shortened by the 1994–95 NHL lockout

Save-percentage leaders (2007–present)
* Season shortened by the 2012–13 NHL lockout
† Season shortened by the COVID-19 pandemic

See also
List of National Hockey League awards
List of NHL statistical leaders
William M. Jennings Trophy
Vezina Trophy

Notes

References

National Hockey League trophies and awards
Ice hockey goaltender awards
Awards established in 1999
Awards disestablished in 2007